The Indonesia World Records Museum (Museum Rekor-Dunia Indonesia or MURI) is a museum located in Semarang, Central Java, Indonesia. A collection of Indonesian records is presented in this museum. Created on January 27, 1990 by Jaya Suprana, this museum contains about 1200 records through July 2005.

External links 
 www.muri.org

Museums in Central Java